Duszniki may refer to the following places:
Duszniki, Greater Poland Voivodeship (west-central Poland)
Duszniki, Łódź Voivodeship (central Poland)
Duszniki-Zdrój in Lower Silesian Voivodeship (south-west Poland)